Kottenborn is a municipality in the district of Ahrweiler, in Rhineland-Palatinate, Germany. It has a population of 172 (2019).

References

Ahrweiler (district)